Hongshan Lake is an alkaline lake located in the disputed territory of Aksai Chin in Rutog County, Ngari Prefecture, Tibet of China.

Location 
The lake is located in the extreme east of Aksai Chin and China National Highway 219 passes through its eastern bank.

References 

Lakes of Ladakh
Geography of Tibet
Rutog County
Aksai Chin
Territorial disputes of China
Territorial disputes of India